Dead & Alive is the first live album by American metalcore band The Devil Wears Prada. It was released on June 26, 2012, through Ferret Music. The album was recorded in Worcester, Massachusetts on the Dead Throne US Tour. This is the last album to feature keyboard player James Baney, before he left the band on February 22, 2012. The album contains a DVD with the live show and also a CD album, which contains songs from their previous albums including the latest album, Dead Throne. To promote the album, the band released a video for "Vengeance" that was recorded live from the tour.

Track listing

Personnel

The Devil Wears Prada
Daniel Williams – drums
Andy Trick – bass guitar
Chris Rubey – lead guitar, backing vocals
Jeremy DePoyster – rhythm guitar, clean vocals
Mike Hranica – lead vocals, guitar (track 7)
James Baney – keyboard, synthesizer, piano

Production
Produced by The Devil Wears Prada & Michael Thelin
Crew: James Barrett, Ben Wilcox, Dustin Derosier, Ben Gering, Filip Isard and Jeff Verne
Engineered by Garrett Davis, Ben Wilcox, Jon Gering, Chris Rubey
Assistant engineer by Brian Thomason
Mixed by Garrett Davis, @ West Main
Management by Randy Dease, Mark Mercado and John Youngman
Filmed, Edited & photo by Jeremy DePoyster
Composed by The Devil Wears Prada
Back cover photo by Adam Elmakias
Mastered by Troy Glessner, @ Spectre Mastering
Package design by Mike Hranica and Chris Rubey
Package layout by Alex Krizhner
Booking by Dave Shapiro and Tom Taaffe (The Agency Group)
Directed by Michael Thelin
Lighting design by Jeff Verne

Charts

References

2012 live albums
Ferret Music albums
Roadrunner Records live albums
The Devil Wears Prada (band) albums